Roy Li Fey Huei, more commonly or affectionally known as Li Fei Hui (Traditional Chinese: 黎沸揮), is a singer from Singapore. He was dubbed as one of Singapore's brightest exports in Taiwan's music industry, back in the early 1990s. For the past two decades, besides penning his own songs and producing his own albums, the musician has also been actively involved in writing and producing hit songs for many popular artistes of the region, such as Andy Lau, Jeff Chang, Jacky Cheung, Kelly Poon, Tanya Chua, A-do, etc. Currently, he is pre-occupied with the training of aspiring artistes and musical talents in his newly established music school – Imagine Music. He is also specially hand-picked by MediaCorp to participate as one of the judges in the judging panel of Singapore's biggest reality Chinese singing competitions – Project Superstar & Campus SuperStar. In 2015, he acted and sung 《等你等到我心痛》 for Channel 8 drama 118.

Biography
Roy was born in Brunei, on 12 July 1965. Standing at the height of 170 cm, the Hainanese, highly anticipated talent started to pen his own songs in 1986, at the age of 21. In the same year, he managed to have three of his songs published and had them sung by well-known artists of the Mando-pop scene. In total, he released five albums in Singapore, three albums in Taiwan, and an outstanding number of ten compilations in the past twenty years of his career.

Though Roy is a songwriter and lyricist, he had not been attending proper music training prior to the release of his chart-topper hits. According to Roy, he just goes according to the feel of his strummings on the guitar when penning songs.

<<愛如潮水>>, a prominent classic hit penned by Roy, catapulted Jeff Chang to instant stardom in 1994. Inevitably, this song managed to top the charts of countless radio stations in Asia, karaoke play lists, cell phone ringtone downloads charts, etc. In addition to this, <<愛如潮水>> has also garnered the likes of Hong Kong's heavenly king, Andy Lau, as he chose to resing and compile it in one of his albums.

Besides penning songs for commercial purposes, the patriotic Roy has also written and published the theme song for the President Star Charity Show in 1994. He specially played this piece of composition on the piano in his 1994 album, in dedication to the then-president of Singapore, Mr Ong Teng Cheong.

After dwelling and carving a niche for himself in Taiwan for 8 years, he decided to return to Singapore and joined Tinybox Music as a music consultant. From then, he embarked on his journey as an instructor who trains aspiring singing talents.

One of his most acclaimed prodigies – Project Superstar female champion of the 1st season, Kelly Poon, whom he had painstakingly trained for three years before she achieved stardom through this nationwide Chinese singing competition.

Besides being the music director for Kelly Poon's debut album, Love Me, Kelly, his self-written songs are also compiled in it.

In November 2006, he left Tinybox Music and established his own music school – .

Project Superstar 2nd season's contestants – Nathaniel Tan (runner up for the male category), Jeremy Kwan, Jeff Teay, are currently under his meticulous tutelage at Focus Music.

Roy is also known as a stern, witty, sarcastic, albeit jovial judge of the previous 2 seasons of Project Superstar and Campus SuperStar.

Awards and nominations
(the list below isn't complete as Roy has garnered too many awards and nominations in his much vaunted 20-year career)

1994 – 2nd 93.3 FM Hit Awards – Nomination for Best Local Artiste
1994 – 2nd 93.3 FM Hit Awards – Nomination for Best Local Music Composition
1995 – 3rd 93.3 FM Hit Awards – Nomination for Best Local Artiste
2000 – 7th 93.3 FM Hit Awards – Best Lyricist
2004 – COMPASS Awards – Best Local Chinese Pop song
2018 – Star Awards Best Theme Song (《小人物向前冲》Life Less Ordinary)

Albums

Television

Chinese/Dialect Series

External links
http://imaginemusicsg.com/home.php – [Imagine Music]

1965 births
Living people
20th-century Singaporean male singers
Singaporean Mandopop singers
Singaporean people of Chinese descent
Temasek Junior College alumni